The University of Richmond (UR or U of R) is a private liberal arts college in Richmond, Virginia. It is a primarily undergraduate, residential institution with approximately 4,350 undergraduate and graduate students in five schools: the School of Arts and Sciences, the E. Claiborne Robins School of Business, the Jepson School of Leadership Studies, the University of Richmond School of Law and the School of Professional & Continuing Studies. It is classified among "Baccalaureate Colleges: Arts & Sciences Focus".

History
The University of Richmond traces its history to a meeting of the Baptist General Association of Virginia held on June 8, 1830. The BGAV resolved "that the Baptists of this State form an education society for the improvement of the ministry." Thus, the Virginia Baptist Education Society was instituted. However, the society did not have enough funds for a proper school yet. In the meantime, they asked their vice-president, Rev. Edward Baptist, "to accept into his home young men wishing to prepare for the ministry." Baptist was an 1813 graduate of Hampden–Sydney College.  In August 1830, William Allgood, the first student of this ministry school, came to Baptist's Dunlora Plantation to attend classes in "a building of three or four rooms." The school, eventually known as Dunlora Academy, enrolled nine students overall in its first year. After two years, the society purchased for $4,000 "Spring Farm," located about five miles north of Richmond. This farm was the home of the Virginia Baptist Seminary which opened July 1, 1832, and began classes July 4 under the leadership of Robert Ryland.

The Virginia Baptist Seminary offered courses in Latin, Greek, and mathematics. One interesting feature of the school was its manual labor component. Each day, students worked for three hours at farm labor. President Ryland thought highly of this system as it was "improving the health, diminishing the expenses, and perhaps guarding the humility of the young preachers." In reality, the farming experiment proved to be unprofitable and was dropped from the school after a couple years. Over time, enrollment and faculty increased to a point where the education society began looking for a more suitable property than small "Spring Farm," where dorms consisted of log cabins while the schoolrooms and the chapel were in a barn.

In 1834, the Virginia Baptist Education Society bought the former Haxall family plantation. This property was much larger and more efficient than "Spring Farm." It was situated of the main house, Columbia, and other brick buildings. As the seminary grew, it became in need of funds. The education society was unable to receive bequests or hold property as it was an unincorporated organization. The seminary could not receive a charter from the legislature as it was a theological school. Therefore, around 1840 the seminary applied for a charter as a liberal arts college, which was granted on March 4 of that year. At this time, the society turned over the land and buildings of the school to the trustees of newly minted Richmond College.

Richmond College officially opened on January 2, 1843. It had "68 students, 3 teachers, land and buildings valued at $20,000, a small endowment, and a library of 700 volumes." For an eleven-month session, tuition and room and board cost $120. The salaries of the teachers were $900 for President Ryland, and $600 and $500 for the other two.

During the American Civil War, the entire student body formed a regiment and joined the Confederate army. Richmond College's buildings were used as a hospital for Confederate troops and later as a barracks for Union soldiers. The college invested all of its funds in Confederate war bonds, and the outcome of the war left it bankrupt. In 1866, James Thomas donated $5,000 to reopen the college.  The T.C. Williams School of Law opened in 1870.

In 1894, the college elected Dr. Frederic W. Boatwright president.  President Boatwright would serve for 51 years.  He is most remembered for raising the funds needed to move the college in 1914 from its original downtown location to a new 350-acre campus in what is now Westhampton area of Richmond, and in doing so created Westhampton College for women.

The institution's main library, Boatwright Memorial Library, is named in Boatwright's honor. Symbolically, the library and its soaring academic gothic tower occupy the highest spot on the grounds. Its grounds were landscaped in 1913, by Warren H. Manning under the supervision of Charles Gillette.

The institution was renamed University of Richmond in 1920 with the men's college renamed Richmond College.  The distinction of colleges was phased out in the late 20th century but the respective parts of the campus continue to be referred to as the Westhampton and the Richmond "sides".

In 1949, the E. Claiborne Robins School of Business opened, followed by the School of Continuing Studies in 1962. In 1969, when financial issues threatened closing the institution or turning it over to the Commonwealth of Virginia, E. Claiborne Robins Sr., a trustee and alumnus, donated $50 million to the institution, the largest gift made to an institution of higher education at the time. In constant dollars, it remains among the largest. Robins' goal was to make Richmond one of the best private universities in the country. In partnership with the institution's president E. Bruce Heilman and development director H. Gerald Quigg the $10 million matching grant component of the gift raised over an additional $60 million, making the institution's total endowment at the time one of the highest in the country.

During World War II, Richmond was one of 131 colleges and universities nationally that took part in the V-12 Navy College Training Program which offered students a path to a Navy commission.

In 1987, a donation of $20 million by Robert S. Jepson Jr. facilitated the opening of the Jepson School of Leadership Studies. The school, which opened in 1992, was the first of its kind in the U.S.

In 1990, the academic missions of Richmond and Westhampton Colleges were combined to form the School of Arts and Sciences.

The Weinstein-Jecklin Speech Center was formed in 1996. Its purpose of The Weinstein-Jecklin Speech Center is to offer assistance to those who wish to pursue effective speaking and articulate behavior across academic disciplines.

On October 15, 1992, presidential candidates George H. W. Bush, Bill Clinton, and Ross Perot came to campus for the first-ever "town hall" televised presidential debate, viewed by 200 million people worldwide. Addressing a crowd of nearly 9,000, President Obama visited the University of Richmond to present the American Jobs Act on September 11, 2011.

On, February 23, 2015, the University of Richmond announced to the student body via email that the board of trustees elected Ronald Crutcher as the tenth president of the institution. He took office July 1, 2015, and his inauguration ceremony was held at the Robins Center on October 30, 2015, becoming the first African American president of the institution.

In August 2021, Kevin F. Hallock became the 11th president of the institution. Hallock, a  labor economist, previously served as the Dean of the SC Johnson College of Business at Cornell University.

The Henry Mansfield Cannon Memorial Chapel, North Court, and Ryland Hall were listed on the National Register of Historic Places in 2013.

Schools

School of Arts & Sciences
All Richmond undergraduate students begin their course work in the School of Arts & Sciences (A&S), which offers 38 majors and 10 concentrations in the arts, sciences, social sciences, and humanities.  The School of Arts & Sciences is composed of 22 departments and 10 interdisciplinary programs.  After one full year of study, students may decide to pursue majors in the other undergraduate schools, though 70 percent of students choose to remain in A&S.

Robins School of Business

The Robins School of Business was established in 1949 and offers undergraduate, graduate and executive education programs. It is named after alumnus E. Claiborne Robins. Admission into the Robins School of Business is granted to students who have completed basic Accounting, Economics and Math courses at the end of three semester while maintaining a Grade Point Average of 2.7 or higher.

Jepson School of Leadership Studies
The Jepson School of Leadership Studies was founded to address a perceived need in the modern world for the academic study of leadership. The school blends a curriculum of economics, history, literature, philosophy, politics, psychology and religion so that students can learn conceptual tools that support the exercise of leadership in varied settings. As of 2016, the Jepson School remains as the only school of its kind in the United States that is completely devoted to the study of leadership.

School of Law

Chartered in 1840, Richmond College was only 30 years old when it added a Law Department. The initial years were very successful for the new Law Department but during the difficult financial times that followed the Civil War, legal education was intermittent at Richmond College until 1890. In that year, the family of the late T.C. Williams Sr., endowed a Professorship of Law, thus assuring the continuous teaching of law at Richmond College. The law school was granted membership in the Association of American Law Schools in 1930 and now enrolls approximately 500 full-time students and has 4,300 active alumni.

School of Professional and Continuing Studies
The School of Professional & Continuing Studies was established in 1962. It offers degree and certificate programs, enrichment opportunities, professional training, and college course work for part-time and non-traditional students of all ages. A variety of evening programs with credit and non-credit courses make it possible for those with busy schedules to further their education or explore new interests.

The school was originally named University College and included both a two-year junior college and an evening division. It was located on the original location of Richmond College on the corner of Grace and Lombardy Streets in Richmond's Fan district. In 1974, the school moved from the Columbia Building at Grace & Lombardy to the main campus in Richmond's West End.

In 1994, the school was renamed the School of Continuing Studies in alignment with names of the other schools of the institution. In 2012, it was renamed the School of Professional & Continuing Studies to better reflect the character of its students and the nature of its programs.

Undergraduate academics

All students must complete general education requirements as part of the liberal arts curriculum.  These requirements include a freshman seminar that all first-year students must complete. Other general education requirements include expository writing, wellness, foreign language, and one class each in six fields of study.

Richmond offers more than 100 majors, minors, and concentrations in three undergraduate schools—the School of Arts and Sciences, the  Robins School of Business, and the Jepson School of Leadership Studies. The School of Continuing Studies, primarily an evening school focused on part-time adult students, offers additional degree programs in selected areas.

Admissions
The University of Richmond admitted just over 24.3 percent of applicants for the class of 2026. The 837-member class of 2023 has a middle 50 percent range for SAT scores of 1370–1500 and a middle 50 percent range for ACT scores of 31–34.

Rankings

In its "America's Best Colleges 2021" issue, U.S. News & World Report ranked Richmond tied for 22nd overall among national liberal arts colleges, tied for 18th "Most Innovative", and the 25th "Best Value".  The Princeton Review named Richmond No. 3 for Best-Run College, No. 4 Best Career Services, No. 4 Best Schools for Internships, No. 5 Best Classroom Experience, and No. 8 Most Beautiful Campus in its 2019 edition of The Best 384 Colleges.

Kiplinger ranked Richmond 18th among the "Best Private Colleges" in the U.S. for 2018. Richmond was ranked eighth by SmartMoney in the category "Best Private Colleges of 2011", leaving two Ivy League Universities behind in the top 10. BusinessWeek ranked the E. Claiborne Robins School of Business as the 12th best undergraduate program in the nation in 2009.

In 2015, Time magazine's Money section named Richmond among "the top 10 colleges with the most generous financial aid." In 2019, Richmond was ranked as the 20th best liberal arts college in America by Niche.  In 2016 and 2017, the University of Richmond was ranked second for the total number of students sent to study abroad among top baccalaureate colleges according to the Institute of International Education's “Open Door Report.”

The University of Richmond's name leads some to believe that it is a public institution drawing students primarily from within Virginia. However, only about 15 percent of UR's undergraduate students are from Virginia. The University of Richmond draws many students from the New England and Mid-Atlantic regions of the United States, but also from across the country and abroad.

Financial aid
Richmond administers a generous financial aid program, with more than 60 percent of all students receiving some form of financial assistance.  Richmond offers a need-blind admissions policy that does not consider an applicant's ability to pay in the admission decision, and it pledges to meet 100 percent of an admitted domestic student's demonstrated need. UR also offers 25 merit-based, full tuition and room and board scholarships to students in each entering class (approximately 1 out of every 30 students). These scholarships are housed under the Richmond Scholars program that also includes benefits like priority class registration, a one-time academic activity stipend, and free admission to Modlin Center events. Recently, to encourage enrollment from Virginia residents, admitted students from Virginia with family incomes of $60,000 or less receive full-tuition/room and board financial aid packages without loans. Richmond's financial aid program is due, in no small part, to its endowment of over $2 billion, placing it within the top 40 nationally among college and university endowments.

Student research

The University of Richmond offers numerous research opportunities for students. In addition to research-based courses, independent studies, and practicums in most disciplines, many special opportunities exist for students to participate in close research collaborations with faculty. Student research occurs in all academic areas, including the arts, sciences, social sciences, and other fields. In 2019 Richmond graduated the fourth most Fulbright Scholars out of American undergraduate institutions.

Student life
Richmond has over 165 student organizations.  Student groups include those devoted to:
Academic interests: (Phi Beta Kappa; WILL*, formerly Women Involved in Learning and Living; Model United Nations),
Student government: Richmond College Student Government Association (RCSGA, est. 1915), Westhampton College Government Association (WCGA, est. 1914), Robins School of Business Student Government Association (RSBSGA, est. 1949), and the Jepson Student Government Association (JSGA, est. 1995)
Media: The Collegian, student newspaper published since 1914; Forum Magazine, a student magazine published in 2013; WDCE, campus radio station; The Messenger, annual arts and literary magazine);
Community service: (Bonner Scholars, Habitat for Humanity, Alpha Phi Omega, Volunteer Action Council (VAC)),
Club sports: (UR Equestrian Team (URET), Richmond Crew, Richmond Ice Hockey Club, Richmond Men's and Women's Soccer, Richmond Co-Ed Swimming, Richmond Synchronized Swimming, Richmond Quidditch, Ultimate Frisbee Club, Richmond Archery Club University of Richmond Rugby Football Club)
Religion: The Office of the Chaplaincy is home to 18 different campus ministries and hosts many different services and events for staff, faculty, and students.  The mission of the Office of the Chaplaincy is to "Inspire generous faith and engage the heart of the University."
Performing arts: (including four a cappella groups: The Octāves, Choeur du Roi, The Sirens, and Off The Cuff; and a student run Improv Comedy Troupe, Subject to Change, which performs free shows on campus several times a year and has also performed at festivals across the mid-Atlantic)
Culture and diversity: (Ngoma African Dance Company, Multicultural Student Union, SCOPE for the LGBTQ+ community, Russian and Slavic Cultural Organization, Cultural Advisors)

The University of Richmond is home to one known secret society RS (University of Richmond). Made up of Richmond College students, the Society is known for its markings on campus and its dedication to University school spirit and camaraderie.

From 1990 to 2003, the Shanghai Quartet served as quartet-in-residence at UR, and their relationship with the institution continues with their roles as Distinguished Visiting Artists.  In 2004, contemporary music sextet eighth blackbird (spelled in all lowercase) was named ensemble-in-residence. Camp Concert Hall, located on campus, is a favorite recording venue for National Public Radio.

Greek Life

Richmond also has an active Greek life with 15 recognized national fraternities and sororities. The fraternities include Alpha Phi Alpha, Kappa Alpha Order, Kappa Sigma, Lambda Chi Alpha, Phi Gamma Delta, and the founding chapter of Sigma Phi Epsilon. Unrecognized fraternities include Sigma Alpha Epsilon, Sigma Chi, and Theta Chi, suspended in 2015, 2019, and 2020, respectively, which maintain underground operations. The sororities are Alpha Kappa Alpha, Delta Sigma Theta, Delta Delta Delta, Delta Gamma, Kappa Alpha Theta, Kappa Delta, Kappa Kappa Gamma, and Pi Beta Phi. In 2018, 50 percent of the women and 35 percent of the men participated in the Greek system.

Traditions
Noted University of Richmond traditions include: an honor code administered by student honor councils; Investiture and Proclamation Night, ceremonies for first year men and women to reflect on their next four years; Ring Dance, a dance held at the Jefferson Hotel by the junior class women; and Pig Roast, a large annual event held during the spring semester which draws significant gatherings of current students and alumni to the fraternity lodges and have featured musical acts such as Flo Rida and Afroman.  Another long-standing Richmond tradition is the crowning of the largest goose on Westhampton Lake with the title "Triceragoose." This establishes that goose as the king of the lake, ruling over all ducks, geese, and freshmen.

International education
In the past decade, the institution has sought to develop a stronger international focus.  International students from about 70 countries represent about 7 percent of the student body.  Approximately half of undergraduate students participate in one of 78 study abroad programs offered by the institution.  Other international programs include Global House, a residential program housed in  Keller Hall, and an international film series. In 2014, the Office of International Education at the institution created the International Student Advisory Board, a group of students dedicated to working with administration to improve the overall experience of international students on campus. Alumna Carole Weinstein donated $9 million toward the construction of a new building on campus, opened in the fall of 2010, dedicated to international education.

Campus

Main campus
Most of the campus lies within the city limits; a small section of the south campus, including the Special Programs Building (home to the student health center and the campus police), intramural sports fields, and most of the campus apartments, lies within Henrico County. The institution has, with few exceptions, remained true to the original architectural plans for the campus—red brick buildings in a collegiate gothic style set around shared open lawns. Many of the original buildings, including Jeter Hall and North Court, both residence halls, and Ryland Hall, the original administration building and library for Richmond College, were designed by Ralph Adams Cram in 1910. Cram, a noted institutional architect, also designed buildings for Princeton, Cornell, Rice, and Williams, among other universities. Warren H. Manning, a former apprentice to Frederick Law Olmsted, designed the original landscape plan. The overall effect of the gothic architecture set amid a landscape of pines, rolling hills, and Westhampton Lake, is intimate and tranquil. In 2000 and again in 2021, the campus was recognized by The Princeton Review as the most beautiful in the United States.

The University of Richmond campus was used to film portions of the pilot of the ABC TV series Commander in Chief, and lead character Mackenzie Allen (played by Geena Davis) served as chancellor of a fictionalized University of Richmond prior to her election as Vice President of the United States. Much of the movie Cry Wolf was filmed on the Westhampton side of campus, with several dormitories, including South Court, North Court, and Keller Hall, serving as locations. An episode of the television show Dawson's Creek was filmed on campus, which served as an unnamed "beautiful Ivy League campus." The filming itself took place in locations throughout the campus, even including rowing on Westhampton Lake.

The University of Richmond owns the former Reynolds Metals Executive Office Building, a gift-purchase from Alcoa in 2001. Located a few miles from campus, the  building was designed by architect Gordon Bunshaft and opened in 1958. The building, which incorporates nearly 1.4 million pounds of aluminum, is listed in the National Register of Historic Places. It currently serves as the headquarters of Altria Group and its subsidiary, Philip Morris USA, which lease it from the institution. The land is currently used for biology research, but future uses could include intramural athletic fields.

The University of Richmond campus used to be home to the Virginia Governor's School for Visual and Performing Arts and Humanities during the summer.

UR Downtown
The institution also operates UR Downtown, a downtown campus of sorts occupying leased space within a larger building at 626 East Broad street. Despite its small size, UR Downtown hosts the Richmond on Broad café (owned and operated by the institution), a mixed-purpose lower-level, art gallery spaces, offices, two classrooms, and a conference room. Located in the city's Arts District, UR Downtown also participates in the monthly art festival, First Fridays. Moreover, the space hosts multiple exhibits each year, often in collaboration with local organizations. The UR Downtown conference room is also home to an original 1956 sgraffito style mural by Hans E. Gassman, created for the bank that occupied the building in the past. Other than art, UR Downtown serves as a VITA site, providing free tax assistance to low-income families. The spaces inside UR Downtown are made available to advocacy and non-profit organizations in need of meeting space. The Caricco Center for Pro Bono law service, the Richmond Families Initiative, and Partners in the Arts also operate out of UR Downtown.

Athletics

The institution won its first national championship in 1982 when women's tennis won the AIAW national championship. The institution won its first NCAA national championship in any sport on December 19, 2008, when the Spiders football team defeated the Montana Grizzlies 24–7 in the NCAA Division I Football Championship (which is exclusively for teams in the Football Championship Subdivision, the second tier of NCAA Division I football).  Richmond was ranked 23rd in men's basketball at one point during the 2009–10 season. During its 2010 season the Richmond Men's Cross Country team placed 24th at the NCAA Division I Cross Country Championships. The 2010-11 Richmond Spiders men's basketball team won the 2011 Atlantic 10 men's basketball tournament, earning the team a spot in the 2011 NCAA Men's Division I Basketball Tournament. The Spiders fell to Kansas in the Sweet Sixteen.

Alumni

See also 
 President of the University of Richmond

References

External links

Richmond Athletics website

 
Educational institutions established in 1830
University of Richmond
University of Richmond
University of Richmond
Universities and colleges accredited by the Southern Association of Colleges and Schools
Tourist attractions in Richmond, Virginia
1830 establishments in Virginia